In statistics, the Freedman–Diaconis rule can be used to select the width of the bins to be used in a histogram. It is named after David A. Freedman and Persi Diaconis. 

For a set of empirical measurements sampled from some probability distribution, the Freedman-Diaconis rule is designed roughly to minimize the integral of the squared difference between the histogram (i.e., relative frequency density) and the density of the theoretical probability distribution.

The general equation for the rule is:

Other approaches
With the factor 2 replaced by approximately 2.59, the Freedman-Diaconis rule asymptotically matches  Scott's normal reference rule for data sampled
from a normal distribution.

Another approach is to use Sturges' rule: use a bin so large that there are about  non-empty bins (Scott, 2009). This works well for n under 200, but was found to be inaccurate for large n. 
For a discussion and an alternative approach, see Birgé and Rozenholc.

References

Rules of thumb
Statistical charts and diagrams
Infographics